Mangga Besar Station (MGB) is a railway station serving by KRL Commuterline system. It's located at Jl. Mangga Besar Raya. It is the named after the major artery road that lies adjacent to the station with the same name, and is also part of the rail system's "Zone 1".

Mangga Besar Station is a new station built as an elevated station in the Manggarai-Jakarta Kota segment. On June 5, 1992, President Soeharto along with Mrs. Tien Soeharto inaugurated the elevated railway by taking the KRL from Gambir to Jakarta Kota Station.

Building and layout 

The Mangga Besar Station building is modern with a touch of orange panels which are still maintained to this day and have never been painted.  It is known that the project, which began in February 1988, spent Rp. 432.5 billion and at the time it was inaugurated was not fully completed until it was fully operational a year later.

Mangga Besar Station has two railway lines, both of them are straight tracks.

Services
The following is a list of train services at the Mangga Besar Station.

Passenger services 
 KAI Commuter

Supporting transportation

References

central Jakarta
Railway stations in Jakarta